Vladimir Petrov may refer to:
Vladimir Petrov (director) (1896–1966), Soviet film director
Vladimir Petrov (diplomat) (1907–1991), Soviet diplomat who defected to Australia
Vladimir Nikolayevich Petrov (1915–1999), writer, teacher, and former prisoner of the Soviet Gulag
Vladimir Petrov (footballer) (born 1940), Soviet international footballer
Vladimir Petrov (rowing) (born 1930), Soviet coxswain at the 1956 Summer Olympics
Vladimir Petrov (ice hockey) (1947–2017), Soviet ice hockey player
Vladimirs Petrovs (1907–1943), Latvian chess player, also known as Vladimir Petrov
Vladimir Petrov (wrestler) (born 1961), ring name of American wrestler Al Blake